is a Japanese former professional baseball pitcher. He has played in Nippon Professional Baseball (NPB) for the Chunichi Dragons.

Career
Chunichi Dragons selected Achira with the forth selection in the 2013 Nippon Professional Baseball draft.

On April 27, 2016, he made his NPB debut.

After the 2020 season, he announced his retirement.

References

External links
 Dragons.jp
 NPB.jp

1992 births
Living people
Baseball people from Osaka Prefecture
Chunichi Dragons players
Japanese baseball players
Nippon Professional Baseball pitchers